"All Fired Up" is a song by Australian musician Matt Corby, released on 7 September 2018, as the second single from his second studio album, Rainbow Valley. The song was certified gold in Australia in 2020.

Music video
A live at Rainbow Valley Studios version was released on 7 September 2018.

Reception
Thomas Bleach said "'All Fired Up' is a moody ballad that explores the inner struggles we sometimes suffer and that one person who can instantly make you feel better and safe from those thoughts. There is a true romantic and honest side to it which will have you reminiscing and reflecting on past and current relationships and people in your life."

JB Hi-Fi said "The bare-bones ballad talks of struggle from the outside, draping the stark, aching admission, 'when you break, I break”', over an understated piano arrangement."

Certifications

References

2018 singles
2018 songs
Matt Corby songs
Songs written by Dann Hume
Song recordings produced by Dann Hume